The Bhede River is a river in India and is a tributary of the Telen River. It is located in Orissa.

See also

Rivers of Odisha
Rivers of India